Thomas Baret (died 1396), was an English Member of Parliament and spicer.

He was a Member (MP) of the Parliament of England for Oxford in September 1388.

References

14th-century births
1396 deaths
14th-century English people
People from Oxford
Members of the Parliament of England (pre-1707)